Schottengymnasium (officially the Öffentliches Schottengymnasium der Benediktiner in Wien) 
is an independent Catholic gymnasium with public status in the First District of Vienna. The school was founded in 1807 by imperial decree, and is considered one of the most prestigious schools in Austria. Alumni of the school include three Nobel laureates, several notable politicians, monarchs, artists and scientists.

Notable alumni

Politicians 
 Anton von Doblhoff-Dier (1800–1872), Austrian Minister-President
 Lajos Batthyány (1807–1849), the first Prime Minister of Hungary
  (1810–1880), Abbot of the Schottenstift,  of Lower Austria
 Josef von Bauer (1817–1886), member of the Lower Austrian Landtag
 Eduard Herbst (1820–1892), Justice Minister of Cisleithania
 Franz Coronini-Cronberg (1830–1901), President of the Austrian Chamber of Deputies
 Heinrich von Wittek (1844–1930), Minister-President of Cisleithania
 Aloys von Liechtenstein (1846–1920),  of Lower Austria
 Hugo von Glanz-Eicha (1848–1915), Minister of Trade of Cisleithania
 Guido von Call (1849–1927), Diplomat, Minister of Trade of Cisleithania
 Engelbert Pernerstorfer (1850–1918), Vice President of the Austrian Chamber of Deputies
 Alfred III. zu Windisch-Grätz (1851–1927), Minister-President of Cisleithania
 Victor Adler (1852–1918), founder of the Social Democratic Party of Austria
 Heinrich von Lützow (1852–1935), diplomat
 Heinrich Lammasch (1853–1920), last serving Minister-President of Cisleithania
 Franz I, Prince of Liechtenstein (1853–1938)
 Franz Klein (1854–1926), Justice Minister of Cisleithania
 Karl Beurle (1860–1919), Member of the Upper Austrian Landtag (Deutsche Volkspartei)
 Konrad zu Hohenlohe-Schillingsfürst (1863–1918), Minister-President of Cisleithania
 Viktor Kienböck (1873–1956), Austrian finance minister
 Charles I of Habsburg-Este (1887–1922), last Emperor of Austria
 Karl Appel (1892–1967), member of the National Council (SPÖ)
 Franz Josef II, Prince of Liechtenstein (1906–1989)
 Leopold Guggenberger (born 1918), Mayor of Klagenfurt (ÖVP)
 Hans Tuppy (born 1924), Austrian Science Minister (ÖVP), Biochemist
 Manfred Mautner Markhof (1927–2008), member of the Federal Council (ÖVP), entrepreneur
 Franz Hums (born 1937), Austrian Labour and Social Affairs Minister (SPÖ)
 Michael Graff (1937–2008), general secretary of the Austrian People's Party (ÖVP)
 Peter Marboe (born 1942), Vienna city councillor for cultural affairs (ÖVP)
 Hans Adam II, Prince of Liechtenstein (born 1945)
 Wolfgang Schüssel (born 1945), former Chancellor of Austria (ÖVP)
 Rudolf Scholten (born 1955), former Austrian Minister of Science and Education (SPÖ)
 Christoph Chorherr (born 1960), former head of the Austrian Green Party
 Johannes Peterlik (born 1967), Austrian diplomat

Arts 
 Franz Wild (1791–1860), opera singer
 Johann Nestroy (1801–1862), actor, playwright
 Eduard von Bauernfeld (1802–1890), poet
 Nikolaus Lenau (1802–1850), poet
 Moritz von Schwind (1804–1871), painter
 Friedrich Halm (1806–1871), poet, playwright
 Anastasius Grün (1806–1876), poet
 Gustav von Franck (1807–1860), writer
 Alexander von Bensa (1820–1902), artist
 Ferdinand Kürnberger (1821–1879), writer
 Johann Strauss II (1825–1899), composer
 Josef Strauss (1827–1870), composer
 Robert Hamerling (1830–1889), poet
 Karl Julius Ebersberg (1831–1876), writer
 Franz von Jauner (1831–1900), actor, theatre director
 Otto Bach (1833–1893), church musician, director of the Mozarteum
 Ferdinand von Saar (1833–1906), writer
 Josef von Doblhoff-Dier (1844–1928), writer, diplomat
 Alfred von Berger (1853–1912), dramaturge, director of the Burgtheater (Imperial Court Theatre)
 Max von Ferstel (1859–1936), architect
 Max Kurzweil (1867–1916), artist
 Maximilian Liebenwein (1869–1926), artist
 Leopold Andrian (1875–1951), writer, diplomat
 Alfred Neugebauer (1888–1957), writer
 Otto Friedländer (1889–1963), writer
 Georg Terramare (1889–1948), playwright
 Paul Elbogen (1894–1987), writer
 Eduard Volters (1904–1972), writer
 Franz Stoß (1909–1995), actor, director of the Burgtheater (Court Theatre) and the Theater in der Josefstadt
  Otto Ambros (1910–1979), writer
 Ernst Haeusserman (1916–1984), theatre director, stage director, writer and film producer
 Ernst Jandl (1925–2000), poet
 Wilfried Seipel (born 1944), former director of the Kunsthistorisches Museum
 Peter Planyavsky (born 1947), organist, composer
 Friedrich Dolezal, cellist of the Vienna Philharmonic Orchestra
 Clemens Hellsberg (born 1952), violinist, member of the board of the Vienna Philharmonic Orchestra
 Herbert Föttinger (born 1961), actor, director of the Theater in der Josefstadt
 Konstantin Reymaier (aka Erich Konstantin Reymaier) (born 1969), organist, composer, Catholic priest
 Rainer Frimmel (born 1971), photographer, film director
 Xaver Bayer (born 1977), writer
 Gottlieb Wallisch (born 1978), pianist

Science 
 Adalbert Nikolaus Fuchs (1814–1886), director of the Polytechnic Institute
 Ernest Hauswirth (1818–1901), historian
 Karl Friesach (1821–1891), astrophysicist
 Franz von Hauer (1822–1899), geologist
 Sigismund Gschwandner (1824–1896), physicist
 Hugo Mareta (1827–1913), Germanist
 Vincenz Knauer (1828–1894), philosopher
 Hugo Kremer von Auenrode (1833–1888), Rector of the University of Prague
 Anton Mayer (1838–1924), historian
 Karl Exner (1842–1914), physicist
 Heinrich Obersteiner (1847–1922), neurologist
 Cölestin Wolfsgruber (1848–1924), church historian
 Hans von Chiari (1851–1916), pathologist
 Heinrich Friedjung (1851–1920), historian, journalist
 Ernst Fuchs (1851–1930), ophthalmologist
 Franz von Liszt (1851–1919), jurist, criminologist, politician
 Sigmund Adler (1853–1920), historian
 Friedrich Becke (1855–1931), mineralogist
 Jakob Minor (1855–1912), scholar
 August Sauer (1855–1926), scholar
 Joseph Seemüller (1855–1920), Germanist
 Alexander Dedekind (1856–1940), Egyptologist
 Julius Wagner-Jauregg (1857–1940), psychiatrist
 Heinrich Swoboda (1861–1923), pastoral theologian
 Lothar von Frankl-Hochwart (1862–1914), neurologist
 Albert Starzer (1863–1909), historian
 Eduard Zirm (1863–1944), ophthalmologist
 Ivo Pfaff (1864–1925), historian of law
 Ernst Kalinka (1865–1946), classical philologist, rector of the University of Innsbruck
 Albert Hübl (1867–1931), historian
 Carl von Kraus (1868–1952), Germanist
 Michael Maria Rabenlechner (1868–1952), scholar
 Maximilian Bittner (1869–1918), orientalist
 Karl Inama von Sternegg (1871–1931), genealogist, scholar of heraldry
 Clemens von Pirquet (1874–1929), immunologist
 Carl Furtmüller (1880–1951), psychologist
 Franz Exner (1881–1947), criminologist
 Karl von Frisch (1886–1982), ethologist, Nobel Prize in Physiology or Medicine 1973
 Franz Borkenau (1900–1957), Geschichtsphilosopher, Soziologe
 Konrad Lorenz (1903–1989), ethologist, Nobel Prize in Physiology or Medicine 1973
 Peter Beck-Mannagetta (1913–1998), geologist
 Michael Mitterauer (born 1937), historian
 Günter Virt (born 1940), theologian
 Herbert Laszlo (1940–2009), scholar in happiness economics
 Georg Braulik (born 1941), biblical scholar (Old Testament)
 Kurt Gschwantler (born 1944), classical archaeologist
 Wolfgang Lutz (born 1956), demographer
 Matthias Scheutz (born 1966), researcher in artificial intelligence and cognitive science
 Michael Schaefberger (born 1967), opinion pollster
 Drehli Robnik (born 1967), scholar in film studies

Others 
 Urban Loritz (1807–1881), minister
 Sebastian Brunner (1814–1893), theologian, writer
 Anton von Petz (1819–1885), admiral
 Hermann Schubert) (1826–1892), minister
 Clemens Kickh (1827–1913), Hofprediger (preacher at court)
 Adolf Kern (1829–1906), minister
 Sigmund Mayer (1832–1920), businessman
 Alexander von Dorn (1838–1919), publicist, economist
 Leopold Rost (1842–1913), abbot of the Schottenstift
 Albert Figdor (1843–1927), banker, art collector
 Karl Graf Lanckoroński (1848–1933), patron of art
 Eugen Böhm von Bawerk (1851–1914), national economist
 Friedrich von Wieser (1851–1926), national economist
 Wilhelm Janauschek (1859–1926), missionary
 Julius Meinl III (1903–1991), entrepreneur (Julius Meinl)
 Heinrich Treichl (born 1913), general manager of the Creditanstalt Bank
 Otto Schönherr (1922–2015), journalist, editor-in-chief of the Austria Press Agency
 Fritz Molden (1924–2014), journalist, publisher
 Gustav Harmer (born 1934), beer brewer (Brauerei Ottakringer, Grieskirchner)
 Heinrich Ferenczy (born 1938), abbot of the Schottenstift and Stift St. Paul in Lavanttal
 Hans-Georg Possanner (1940–2006), Pressesprecher der Ständigen Vertretung Österreichs bei der EU
 Franz Hlavac (born 1948), Wirtschaftsjournalist (ORF)
 Johannes Jung (born 1952), abbot of the Schottenstift
 Andreas Treichl (born 1952), general manager of the Erste Bank
 Christoph Herbst (born 1960), Constitutional Court judge
 Nikolaus Krasa (born 1960), vicar general of the Roman Catholic Archdiocese of Vienna
 Rudolf Mitlöhner (born 1965), journalist, editor-in-chief of the Die Furche magazine
 Lothar Tschapka (born 1966), elocutionist
 Georg Spatt (born 1967), director of the Hitradio Ö3 radio channel at the ORF (broadcaster) (Austrian Broadcasting Corporation)
 Niki Zitny (born 1973), golfer

References

External links
Official site 

Schools in Vienna
Educational institutions established in 1807
Catholic schools in Austria
Innere Stadt